Pablo Baldivieso (born 30 June 1949) is a Bolivian footballer. He played in two matches for the Bolivia national football team from 1977 to 1979. He was also part of Bolivia's squad for the 1979 Copa América tournament.

References

1949 births
Living people
Bolivian footballers
Bolivia international footballers
Place of birth missing (living people)
Association football midfielders